Rajpurohit is a variant spelling of the surname Rajpurohit.

Rajpurohit may also refer to:

People
 Govind Singh Rajpurohit, an Indian legal educational administrator.
 Gulab Singh Rajpurohit is an Indian politician from the Bharatiya Janata Party.
 Jethu Singh Rajpurohit, an Indian politician and member of the Indian National Congress from Bali, Rajasthan.
 Shankar Singh Rajpurohit, an Indian politician from the Bharatiya Janata Party.